Giovanni Luigi Bonelli (22 December 1908 – 12 January 2001) was an Italian comic book author and publisher, best remembered as the co-creator of Tex Willer in 1948, together with artist Aurelio Galleppini.

Career
Bonelli was born in Milan. He founded Casa Audace Editrice, later to be known as Sergio Bonelli Editore, in 1940.

In 1948 he created Occhio Cupo and Tex Willer (both drawn by Galleppini). Tex Willer is among the most popular characters of Italian comics, with translations to numerous languages all around the world. 

He wrote several early episodes of Zagor (issues #6–10, 13–14). Bonelli remained to supervise the production of Tex until his death in Alessandria. His son Sergio Bonelli (1932–2011)  was also a comic book writer, as well as a publisher of comics.

External links   
 A short biography of G. L. Bonelli and A. Galleppini

1908 births
2001 deaths
Italian comics writers
Writers from Milan
Comic book publishers (people)
Italian publishers (people)
Businesspeople from Milan